Prato Centrale railway station is the main station serving the city and comune of Prato, in the region of Tuscany, central Italy. Opened in 1862, it forms part of both the Bologna–Florence railway and the Viareggio–Florence railway. Until 2002 it was named simply as Prato.

Overview
The station is currently managed by Rete Ferroviaria Italiana (RFI).  However, the commercial area of the passenger building is managed by Centostazioni.  Train services to and from the station are operated by Trenitalia.  Each of these companies is a subsidiary of Ferrovie dello Stato (FS), Italy's state-owned rail company.

There are two other stations in the city, namely Prato Porta al Serraglio (in the historical center of Prato) and the new station at Prato Borgonuovo.

The prato central railway station is situated on the Bologna-Florence direttissima railway line .

See also

History of rail transport in Italy
List of railway stations in Tuscany
Rail transport in Italy
Railway stations in Italy

External links

Buildings and structures in Prato
Railway stations in Tuscany
Railway stations opened in 1934
1862 establishments in Italy
Railway stations in Italy opened in the 19th century